The Campbell House, also known as the Valentine House), is a historic house at 3147 County Road 470 in Okahumpka, Florida. It is locally significant as an excellent example of a frame vernacular house, and as one of the few houses built in the 19th century in Okahumpka. The home contains a historical marker to Virgil D. Hawkins, a civil rights activist born and raised in the area.

Description and history 
It is a two-story frame vernacular house with an "L" shaped footprint and a one-story addition on the side. The main block is in an I-house form, one room deep with a central staircase. The two-story gable extension on the rear contains the kitchen and work area. A majority of the windows are 6/6 double-hung vinyl sashes which were designed replicate the historic wooden windows.

It was added to the National Register of Historic Places on November 12, 1999.

References

External links

 Lake County listings at National Register of Historic Places
  at 

Houses on the National Register of Historic Places in Florida
National Register of Historic Places in Lake County, Florida
Houses in Lake County, Florida
Vernacular architecture in Florida